Peperomia glandulosa is a species of plant in the family Piperaceae. It is endemic to Ecuador.

References

glandulosa
Endemic flora of Ecuador
Critically endangered flora of South America
Taxonomy articles created by Polbot